Angola Swamp is a pocosin in southern coastal North Carolina near Jacksonville, in Duplin and Pender counties. Much of the swamp is included in the  Angola Bay Game Land, administered by the North Carolina Wildlife Resources Commission. The southern section of the swamp was logged and has a road grid, while the northern portion is wild and roadless. The swamp is drained by the Northeast Cape Fear River.

References

Swamps of North Carolina
Protected areas of Pender County, North Carolina
Protected areas of Duplin County, North Carolina
Landforms of Pender County, North Carolina
Nature reserves in North Carolina
Landforms of Duplin County, North Carolina
Pocosins